Benjamín Máximo Laguna y Villanueva (December 2, 1822 - January 3, 1902) was a Spanish botanist and entomologist.

While the standard form of his name is "Laguna", he is sometimes referred to by both surnames "Laguna y Villanueva".

Education
Máximo Laguna was born in Santa Cruz de Mudela, in the province of Ciudad Real.
In 1848 he enrolled at the Spanish forestry school, the Escuela Especial de Ingenieros de Montes, which had been recently founded at the Castle of Villaviciosa de Odón near Madrid. He received a grant to continue his studies in the Kingdom of Saxony, where he enrolled at the Royal Saxon Academy of Forestry at Tharandt, near Dresden.

Research
The International Plant Names Index lists his botanical interests as Pteridophytes and Spermatophytes. He published on the flora of Spanish forests.  He also studied the botany of the Philippines, which was at the time a Spanish colonial possession, although he did not visit the country. He described a tree, Quercus jordanae Laguna, which had been collected in Luzon by one of his forestry service colleagues. (The tree has been reclassified as a lithocarpus since Laguna made the species known to science).

His interest in insects related to his studies of their impact on trees.

Honours and legacy

 Laguna was a member of the Spanish Royal Academy of Sciences.
 A school is named after him in his native town.
 The “Máximo Laguna” Arboretum at Valsaín in the Sierra de Guadarrama was planted in 1997 to commemorate World Forestry Day. Valsaín has since been included by UNESCO in a Biosphere reserve, Real Sitio de San Ildefonso-El Espinar.

References

External links
 

19th-century Spanish botanists
Forestry academics
Spanish foresters
People from the Province of Ciudad Real
1822 births
1902 deaths
Forestry in Spain
Royal Saxon Academy of Forestry alumni